Seminole County Public Schools (SCPS) is a public school district that covers Seminole County, Florida. , the total district wide enrollment was 66,351 students.

History
During the COVID-19 pandemic in Florida, as of August 2021 Seminole County allows parents to opt out of their children wearing masks, but if there is no parental opt-out students must wear masks. In August 2021 17% of students were exempted.

School board
The District School Board is elected on a non-partisan basis. Members serve four year terms.

Schools
The district operates 57 traditional schools.  This includes nine high schools, 12 middle schools, and 36 elementary schools.

High schools
 Crooms Academy of Information Technology (Panther)
 Hagerty High School (Husky)
 Lake Brantley High School (Patriot)
 Lake Howell High School (Silverhawk)
 Lake Mary High School (Ram)
 Lyman High School (Greyhound)
 Oviedo High School (Lion)
 Seminole High School (Seminole)
 Winter Springs High School (Bear)

Middle schools
 Greenwood Lakes Middle School (Soaring Eagles)
 Indian Trails Middle School (Trailblazers)
 Jackson Heights Middle School (Bobcats)
 Lawton Chiles Middle School (Panthers)
 Markham Woods Middle School (Mustangs)
 Millennium Middle School (Falcons)
 Milwee Middle School (Spartans)
 Rock Lake Middle School (Raiders)
 Sanford Middle School (Warriors)
 South Seminole Academy (Lighthouse)
 Teague Middle School (Tigers)
 Tuskawilla Middle School (Titans)

Elementary schools

 Altamonte Elementary School
 Bear Lake Elementary School
 Bentley Elementary School
 Carillon Elementary School
 Casselberry Elementary School
 Crystal Lake Elementary School
 Eastbrook Elementary School
 English Estates Elementary School
 Evans Elementary School
 Forest City Elementary School
 Geneva Elementary School
 Goldsboro Elementary School
 Hamilton Elementary School

 Heathrow Elementary School
 Highlands Elementary School
 Idyllwilde Elementary School
 Keeth Elementary School
 Lake Mary Elementary School
 Lake Orienta Elementary School
 Lawton Elementary School
 Layer Elementary School
 Longwood Elementary School 
 Midway Elementary School
 Partin Elementary School
 Pine Crest Elementary School

 Rainbow Elementary School
 Red Bug Elementary School
 Sabal Point Elementary School
 Spring Lake Elementary School
 Stenstrom Elementary School
 Sterling Park Elementary School
 Walker Elementary School
 Wekiva Elementary School
 Wicklow Elementary School
 Wilson Elementary School
 Winter Springs Elementary School
 Woodlands Elementary School

Charter schools
There are the four charter schools that are accountable to SCPS.
 Choices in Learning Elementary Charter School
 Galileo School for Gifted Learning
 United Cerebral Palsy School
 Seminole Science Charter School

Home schools and virtual schools
The district operates home school and virtual school programs.

Voluntary Pre-K
The district operates voluntary pre-K at selected locations within the District.

References

External links

 
 Seminole County Public Schools Collection – RICHES Mosaic Interface

 
School districts in Florida
Education in Seminole County, Florida
Educational institutions in the United States with year of establishment missing